Stan Larson (born February 26, 1946) is an American author, researcher, and librarian.

Biography
Larson was born in Tacoma, Washington, and was raised in Boise, Idaho. As a young man, he served as a missionary for the Church of Jesus Christ of Latter-day Saints (LDS Church) in England (he turned down an assignment to Brazil). He received a Bachelor of Arts in history and a Master of Arts in ancient scripture from Brigham Young University (BYU).

Beginning in 1974, Larson was a scripture translation researcher and guide writer for the LDS Church. He resigned in 1985 and left the LDS Church after he, through his research, lost faith in the Book of Mormon and other scriptural writings of Joseph Smith.

After leaving the employment of the LDS Church, he worked as a religious archives specialist at the Marriott Library of the University of Utah. In 1988, he received a master's degree in library and information sciences from BYU. He later earned a PhD in theology from the University of Birmingham. In 2001, he became an associate librarian and curator of manuscripts at the Marriott Library. He retired from this position in 2011.

Larson wrote and edited several books and has published articles in BYU Studies, Dialogue, Ensign, Evangelical Quarterly, Journal of Mormon History, Sunstone, and Trinity Journal.

Works
Stan Larson and Lorille Horne Miller. Unitarianism in Utah: A Gentile Religion in Salt Lake City, 1891–1991 (1991, Freethinker Press)
Stan Larson. Quest for the Gold Plates: Thomas Stuart Ferguson's Archaeological Search for the Book of Mormon (1997,  Signature Books)

Notes

References
Stan Larson papers, 1842–2011, archiveswest.orbiscascade.org.

1946 births
20th-century Mormon missionaries
Alumni of the University of Birmingham
American librarians
American male non-fiction writers
American Mormon missionaries in England
Brigham Young University alumni
Former Latter Day Saints
Historians of the Latter Day Saint movement
Latter Day Saints from Idaho
Living people
Mormon studies scholars
Religious studies scholars
People from Boise, Idaho
University of Utah staff